Golfinity is an endless mini-golf game created by NimbleBit.

Gameplay 
Golfinity tasks the player with making the ball go into the hole of a randomly generated level. To shoot the ball the player taps and drags their finger across the screen (with the power of the shot represented by dashed lines). Once the player gets the ball into the hole, the player moves on to the next level.

Reception 
Golfinity received mostly positive reviews. Metacritic gave the game a score of 75 out of 100. Apple'N'Apps gave the game as score of 4.5 out of 5 praising the game as a "great game of mini-golf", having "smooth controls", having "beautiful hole design" and that there are "so many holes to play" while criticizing the fact that it is "Tough to judge depth at times", there is "no way to speed slow animations", and there is "no way to restart quickly". Gamezebo gave the game 3.5 stars out of 5, praising it as a "satisfying blend between arcade physics and skill-testing precision" while criticizing the "wonky execution of the game's physics spoil the occasional hole".

References 

IOS games
Miniature golf video games
NimbleBit games